Cao Guangjing (born March 1964) is a Chinese business executive and politician. He was investigated by China's top anti-graft agency in February 2022. Previously he served as vice governor of Hubei. He was an alternate member of the 18th Central Committee of the Chinese Communist Party.

Biography
Cao was born in the town of  Zouping County, Shandong, in March 1964. He received his bachelor's degree and master's degree from Hohai University in 1985 and 1990, respectively.

After university, he served in various posts in the Preparation Office of China Three Gorges Corporation before serving as chairman in January 2010.

In May 2014, he was promoted to become vice governor of Hubei, a position he held until February 2022.

Downfall
On 24 February 2022, he has been placed under investigation for "serious violations of discipline and laws" by the Central Commission for Discipline Inspection (CCDI), the party's internal disciplinary body, and the National Supervisory Commission, the highest anti-corruption agency of China. On November 5, he was arrested for suspected bribe taking by the Supreme People's Procuratorate.

References

1964 births
Living people
People from Zouping
Hohai University alumni
Tianjin University alumni
Chinese chief executives
21st-century Chinese businesspeople
People's Republic of China politicians from Jiangsu
Chinese Communist Party politicians from Jiangsu
Alternate members of the 18th Central Committee of the Chinese Communist Party
Alumni of Durham University